Bandisa Ndlovu (born ) is a South African rugby union player for the Griffons (rugby union) in the Currie Cup and in the Rugby Challenge. He can play as a prop or a flank.

References

South African rugby union players
Living people
Zulu people
1996 births
People from Inkosi Langalibalele Local Municipality
Rugby union props
Rugby union flankers
Sharks (Currie Cup) players
Aviron Bayonnais players
Griquas (rugby union) players
Griffons (rugby union) players
Rugby union players from KwaZulu-Natal